John Lefeaver (25 December 1817 – 20 December 1879) was an English first-class cricketer who played for Kent County Cricket Club during the early years of the club's history.

Lefeaver was born at Stile Bridge on the River Beult in the parish of Marden in Kent. Lefeaver's family ran the Stile Bridge Inn. He played in a total of nine first-class matches, including during the 1841 Canterbury Cricket Week during which the first Kent County Cricket Club was founded and for the county side until 1854.

He died in either Stile Bridge or Upper Hardres in 1879 aged 61.

Notes

External links
 

1817 births
1879 deaths
People from Marden, Kent
Kent cricketers
English cricketers of 1826 to 1863
English cricketers